The Dutch male given name Hendrik is a cognate of the English Henry. The spelling Hendrick was interchangeable until the 19th century. Birth names of people with this name can be Latinized to Henderikus, Hendricus, Hendrikus, or Henricus, while common nicknames for Hendrik are Han, Hein, Henk, Hennie, Henny, Henri, Henry, Rijk, and Rik. People with Hendrik or Hendrick as their first name include:

Academics
Hendrik Willem Bakhuis Roozeboom (1854–1907), Dutch physical chemist
Hendrik Pieter Barendregt (born 1947), Dutch logician
Hendrik Wade Bode (1905–1982), American engineer, researcher, inventor, author and scientist
Hendrik Wilhelm Bodewitz (born 1939), Dutch Sanskrit scholar
Hendrik Enno Boeke (1881–1918), Dutch mineralogist and petrographer.
Hendrik Jan Maarten Bos (born 1940), Dutch historian of mathematics
Hendrik Brugmans (1906–1997), Dutch literary theorist and linguist
Hendrik Casimir (1909–2000), Dutch physicist known for the Casimir effect
Hendrik Constantijn Cras (1739–1820), Dutch jurist and librarian
Hendrik van Eikema Hommes (1930–1984), Dutch legal scholar  and philosopher
Hendrik van Etten (1591–1670), Pseudonym of Jean Leurechon, French mathematician
Hendrik C. Ferreira (born 1950s), South African information scientist
Hendrik van der Flier (born 1945), Dutch psychologist
Hendrik Marinus Franken (born 1966), Dutch engineer and enterprise architect
Hendrik van Gent (1899–1947), Dutch astronomer
Hendrik Jacob Hamaker (1844–1911), Dutch jurist
Hendrik Hart (born 1935), Dutch and Canadian philosopher
Hendrik van Heuraet (1633–1660?), Dutch mathematician
Hendrik Hondius I (1573–1650), Flemish-born Dutch engraver, cartographer and publisher
Hendrik Hondius II (1597–1651), Dutch engraver, cartographer and publisher
Hendrik S. Houthakker (1924–2008), Dutch and American economist
Hendrik C. van de Hulst (1918–2000), Dutch astronomer and mathematician
Hendrik Kern (1833–1917), Dutch linguist and Orientalist
Hendrik Johan Kessels (1781–1849), Dutch-born clock and naval chronometer maker
Hendrik Kloosterman (1900–1968), Dutch mathematician
Hendrik Anthony Kramers (1894–1952), Dutch physicist 
Hendrik Lenstra (born 1949), Dutch mathematician
Hendrik Lorentz (1853–1928), Dutch physicist and Nobel Laureate
Hendrik de Moy (1534–1610), Secretary of Antwerp.
Hendrik Nienhuis (1790–1862), Dutch legal scholar and university president
Hendrik Poinar (born 1969), Dutch evolutionary biologist
Hendrick van den Putte (1574–1646), Dutch humanist and philologist
Hendrick Peter Godfried Quack (1834–1917), Dutch legal scholar, economist and historian
Hendrik Relve (born 1948), Estonian environmentalist, nature writer and nature photographer
Hendrik van Rheede (1636–1691), Dutch colonial governor and botanist
Hendrik van Riessen (1911–2000), Dutch philosopher
Hendrik van Rijgersma (1835–1877), Dutch naturalist and botanist
Hendrik de Roy (1598–1679), Dutch philosopher and physician
Hendrik Gerard van de Sande Bakhuyzen (1838–1923), Dutch astronomer
Hendrik Schatz (born c.1970), German nuclear astrophysicist
Hendrik Schön (born 1970), German physicist accused of fraud
Hendrik G. Stoker (1899–1993), South African Calvinist philosopher
Hendrik Tennekes (born 1936), Dutch meteorologist
Hendrik C. Tijms (born 1944), Dutch mathematician
Hendrik Tolman (born 1961), Dutch and American civil engineer and oceanographer
Hendrik Van Brussel (born 1944), Belgian mechanical engineer
Hendrik W. (H.W.) van der Merwe (1929–2001), South African academic and anti-apartheid activist
Hendrik Albertus van der Vorst (born 1944), Dutch mathematician
Hendrik Wagenvoort (1886–1976), Dutch classical scholar
Hendrik Johannes van der Windt (born 1955), Dutch environmental scientist
Hendrik de Wit (1909–1999), Dutch systematic botanist
Hendrik Wyermars (1685–1757), Dutch atheist philosopher
Hendrik Zwaardemaker (1857–1930), Dutch physiologist who invented the olfactometer

Arts
Hendrik Abbé (1639–c.1680), Flemish painter, engraver and architect
Hendrick Aerts (c.1570–1603), Flemish painter and draftsman
Hendrik Christian Andersen (1872–1940), Norwegian-American sculptor, painter and urban planner
Hendrick Andriessen (1607–1655), Flemish still-life painter
Hendrick van Anthonissen (1605–1656), Dutch seascape painter
Hendrik-Jozef Antonissen (1737–1794), Flemish painter of landscapes and cattle
Hendrick Avercamp (1585–1634), Dutch landscape and genre painter
Hendrick van Balen (c.1574–1632), Flemish Baroque painter and stained glass designer
Hendrick van Balen the Younger (1623–1661), Flemish history painter
Hendrik Bary (1632–1707), Dutch engraver
Hendrick Berckman (1629–1679), Dutch portrait painter
Hendrik Petrus Berlage (1856–1934), Dutch architect
Hendrik Beyaert (1823–1894), Belgian architect
Hendrick Bloemaert (1601–1672), Dutch portrait and historical painter
Hendrick Bogaert (1630–1675), Dutch genre painter
Hendrik van der Borcht the Elder (1583–1651), Flemish engraver and still life painter
Hendrik van der Borcht II (1614–1676), German Baroque painter
Hendrik van Borssum Buisman (1873–1951), Dutch painter and museum curator
Hendrick van den Broeck (c.1530–1597), Flemish Mannerist painter
Hendrick ter Brugghen (1588–1629), Dutch Caravaggist painter
Hendrick van der Burgh (1627–aft.1664), Dutch genre painter
Hendrik Carré (1656–1721), Dutch painter
Hendrik Carré II (1696–1775), Dutch painter
Hendrik Chabot (1894–1949), Dutch painter and sculptor
Hendrik Claudius (c.1655–c.1700), German-born natural history illustrator 
Hendrick de Clerck (c.1560–1630), Flemish Mannerist painter
Hendrick van Cleve III (c.1525–c.1595), Flemish painter and engraver
Hendrick Coning (1604–1660), Dutch portrait painter
Hendrik Frans de Cort (1742–1810), Flemish landscape painter
Hendrick Couturier (1620–1684), Dutch portrait painter and settler in New Netherland
Hendrick Danckerts (c.1625–1680), Dutch landscape painter and engraver
Hendrik Adriaan Christiaan Dekker (1836–1905), Dutch painter and lithographer
Hendrick Joseph Dillens (1812–1872), Belgian genre painter
Hendrik Berend Dorgelo (1894–1961), Dutch physicist and academic
Hendrick Dubbels (1621–1707), Dutch seascape painter
Hendrik Faydherbe (1574–1629), Flemish sculptor, gilder, and poet
Hendrick Fromantiou (1633–1693), Dutch still life painter
Hendrik Goltzius (1558–1617), Dutch printmaker, draftsman, and painter
Hendrick Goudt (1583–1648), Dutch landscape and biblical painter
Hendrik Graauw (1627–1693), Dutch painter
Hendrik-Jan Grievink (born 1977), Dutch graphic designer and editor 
Hendrik van der Haert (1790–1846), Flemish portrait painter, sculptor, illustrator and engraver
Hendrik Heerschop (1626–1690), Dutch painter
Hendrik Herregouts (1633–1704), Flemish history and portrait painter and draughtsman
Hendrik Peter Jonker (1912–2002), Dutch photographer
Hendrik Kerstens (born 1956), Dutch photographer and visual artist
Hendrik Keun (1738–1787), Dutch city and landscape painter
Hendrick de Keyser (1565–1631), Dutch sculptor and architect 
Hendrik Kobell (1751–1779), Dutch sea and landscape painter
Hendrik Pieter Koekkoek (1843–1927), Dutch landscape painter
Hendrik Maarten Krabbé (1868–1931), Dutch genre and portrait painter
Hendrik Krawen (born 1963), German visual and installation artist
Hendrick Krock (1671–1738), Danish history painter
Hendrik van Limborch (1681–1759), Dutch painter and engraver
Hendrik Frans van Lint (1684–1763), Flemish landscape painter
Hendrik Luyten (1859–1945), Dutch-born Belgian painter.
Hendrik Martz (born 1968), German actor
Hendrick de Meijer (1620–1689), Dutch landscape painter
Hendrik de Meijer (1744–1793), Dutch wallpaper painter
Hendrik Willem Mesdag (1831–1915), Dutch seascape painter
Hendrik van Minderhout (1632–1696), Dutch-Flemish seascape painter
Hendrick Mommers (1623–1693), Dutch landscape painter
Hendrik Munnichhoven (died 1664), Swedish court painter
Hendrick Munniks (c.1600–1664), Dutch painter
Hendrik H.J. Ngantung (1921–1991), Indonesian painter and politician
Hendrick ten Oever (1639–1716), Dutch painter
Hendrik van Oort (1775–1847), Dutch landscape painter
Hendrik Gerritsz Pot (c.1580–1657), Dutch genre and portrait painter
Hendrik Pothoven (1725–1807), Dutch drawer and painter 
Hendrik Reekers (1815–1854), Dutch still life painter
Hendrik Rietschoof (1678–1747), Dutch seascape painter
Hendrik van de Sande Bakhuyzen (1795–1860), Dutch landscape painter
Hendrik Frans Schaefels (1827–1904), Belgian Romantic painter, draughtsman and engraver
Hendrik Adolf Schaep (1826–1870), Belgian seascape painter
Hendrik Scheffer (1798–1862), Dutch Romantic painter who lived in France
Hendrik Jacobus Scholten (1824–1907), Dutch painter
Hendrik Schoock (1630–1707), Dutch history and still life painter
Hendrik Willem Schweickhardt (1747–1797), German landscape painter
Hendrick Snyers (1611–1644), Flemish engraver
Hendrick van Someren (c.1610–1685), Dutch painter
Hendrick Sorgh (1666–1720), Dutch broker and art collector
Hendrik Martensz Sorgh (c.1610–1670), Dutch genre painter
Hendrik Spilman (1721–1784), Dutch painter and engraver
Hendrik van Steenwijk I (c.1550–1603), Dutch architectural painter
Hendrik van Steenwijk II (c.1580–1640), Dutch architectural, biblical and still life painter
Hendrick van Streeck (1659–1720), Dutch architectural painter
Hendrik Tavenier (1734–1807), Dutch landscape draughtsman and painter
Henricus Jacobus Tollens (1864-1936), Dutch photographer
Hendrick van Uylenburgh (1587–1661), Dutch art dealer
Hendrik Veen (1823–1905), Dutch photographer in the Dutch East Indies
Hendrik Frans Verbrugghen (1654–1724), Flemish sculptor and draftsman
Hendrik Vermeulen (born 1982), South African fashion designer
Hendrik Verschuring (1627–1690), Dutch landscape painter
Hendrick Cornelisz van Vliet (1611–1675), Dutch architectural painter
Hendrik Voogd (1768–1839), Dutch landscape painter and printmaker
Hendrick Cornelisz Vroom (1562–1640), Dutch seascape painter
Hendrik Nicolaas Werkman (1882–1945), Dutch experimental artist, typographer and printer
Hendrik Wouda (1885–1946), Dutch architect and furniture designer
Hendrik Emil Wouters (1882–1916), Belgian fauvist painter and sculptor
Hendrik van Wueluwe (1460–c.1533), Flemish Renaissance painter

Business
Hendrik Adriaan van Beuningen (1841–1908), Dutch businessman and politician
Hendrik van der Bijl (1887–1948), South African electrical engineer and industrialist
Hendrick van Buyten (1632–1701), Dutch baker
Hendrik Carloff (c.1621–c.1690), Swedish slave trader
Hendrik Godfried Duurkoop (1736–1778), Dutch merchant-trader and VOC Opperhoofd in Japan
Hendrik Figee (1838–1907), Dutch cranes manufacturer
Hendrik G. Meijer (born 1952), American CEO of the supermarket chain Meijer
Hendrik Pasma (1813–1890), Dutch writer, farmer and politician
Hendrik Pontoppidan (1814–1901), Danish merchant, consul and philanthropist
Hendrik Caspar Romberg (1744–1793), Dutch bookkeeper, merchant-trader and VOC Opperhoofd in Japan
Hendrick van Rensselaer (1667–1740), New York colony landowner

Exploration
Hendrik Brouwer (1581–1653), Dutch explorer, admiral, and colonial administrator
Hendrick Christiaensen (died 1616), Dutch explorer
Hendrik Coetzee (c.1975–2010), South African explorer
Hendrik Dolleman (1905–1990), Dutch-born American Air Force serviceman and explorer
Hendrick Jacobs Falkenberg (c.1640–1712), German interpreter in New Netherland and New Sweden
Hendrick Hamel (1630–1692), Dutch journalist and explorer
Hendrik Hudson (c.1565–1611), Dutch contemporary name for the English explorer
Hendrik Albertus Lorentz (1871–1944), Dutch explorer of New Guinea
Hendrik Pieter Nicolaas Muller (1859–1941), Dutch businessman, diplomat, explorer, publicist, and philanthropist
Hendrik Jacob Wikar (1752–?), Finnish explorer
Hendrik van Zyl (1828–1880), First Afrikaner settler in Botswana

Military
Hendrik van den Bergh (1573–1638), Dutch count, who served in the Spanish military
Hendrik Born (1944–2021), East German Navy vice admiral
Hendrik Bosch (1776–aft.1840), Dutch military officer and Governor of the Dutch Gold Coast
Hendrik G.B. van den Breemen (born 1941), Dutch Marine Corps generals
Hendrik Detmers (1761–1825), Dutch military commander at Waterloo
Hendrik Gravé (1670–1749), Dutch admiral
Hendrick van der Heul (1676–1762), Dutch privateer
Hendrik Klopper (1903–1977), South African military commander
Hendrik A. Kotze (born 1919), South African Army general
Hendrik Merkus de Kock (1779–1845), Dutch military general, minister, and senator
Hendrick Lonck (1568–1634), Dutch navy admiral
Hendrik III of Nassau-Breda (1483–1538), Dutch stadtholder and military leader
Hendrik van Nassau-Ouwerkerk (1640–1708), Dutch military general 
Hendrik George de Perponcher Sedlnitsky (1771–1856), Dutch general and diplomat
Hendrik Prinsloo (1890–1966), South African military commander
Hendrik Rusius (1624–1679), Dutch officer and fortification engineer
Hendrik Seyffardt (1872–1943), Dutch general and Nazi collaborator
Hendrick Sharp (1815–1892), Union Navy sailor in the American Civil War
Hendrik Trajectinus, Count of Solms (1636–1693), Dutch lieutenant-general
Hendrick K. van Rensselaer (1744–1816), American Colonel during the American Revolutionary War
 Hendrik Witbooi, chief of the Khowesin people, a sub-tribe of the Khoikhoi, regarded as one of the national heroes of Namibia, one of the principal commanders of Herero Wars

Music
Hendrik Andriessen (1892–1981), Dutch composer and organist
Hendrik Herman Badings (1907–1987), Dutch composer
Hendrik Bouman (born 1951), Dutch harpsichordist, conductor and composer
Hendrik Bredeniers (c.1472–1522), Flemish organist and music teacher
Hendrik Hofmeyr (born 1957), South African composer
Hendrik Möbus (born 1976), German Neo Nazi and heavy metal musician
Hendrik Niehoff (1495–1561), Dutch pipe organ builder
Hendrik Sal-Saller (born 1966), Estonian rock singer and guitarist
Hendrik N.T. Simons (born 1955), Dutch singer
Hendrik Speuy (c.1575–1625), Dutch renaissance organist and composer
Hendrik Stedler (born 1968), German sound designer, audio engineer and song composer

Politics and government
Hendrik Allik (1901–1989), Estonian communist politician
Hendrik Becker (1661–1722), Dutch Governor of Ceylon
Hendrik Beernink (1910–1979), Dutch Minister of the Interior
Hendrick van Berckenrode (c.1565–1534), Dutch mayor of Haarlem portrayed by Frans Hals
Hendrik van Boeijen (1889–1947), Dutch Minister of Defence and the Interior
Hendrik Bogaert (born 1968), Flemish politician
Hendrik I of Brabant (1165–1235), Duke of Brabant and Lothier
Hendrik II van Brabant (1207–1248), Duke of Brabant and Lothier
Hendrick van Brederode (1531–1568), Dutch noble and early leader of the Dutch Revolt
Hendrik Brouwer (1581–1653), Dutch explorer, admiral, and Governor-General of the East Indies
Hendrik Casimir I of Nassau-Dietz (1612–1640), Dutch stadtholder of Friesland, Groningen and Drenthe
Hendrik Casimir II of Nassau-Dietz (1657–1696), Dutch stadtholder of Friesland and Groningen
Hendrick Chin A Sen (1934–1999), Surinamese politician, President of Suriname 1980-82
Hendrik Colijn (1869–1944), Prime Minister of the Netherlands
Hendrik Cornelis (1910–1999), Belgian Governor-General of the Belgian Congo
Hendrik Daems (born 1959), Flemish politician
Hendrik Davi (born 1977), French politician
Hendrik de Man (1882–1953), Belgian Labour Party politician
Hendrik Doeff (1764–1837), Dutch diplomat in Japan
Hendrik Lodewijk Drucker (1857–1917), Dutch liberal politician
Hendrik Jan van Duren (1937–2008), Dutch politician
Hendrik Elias (1902–1973), Belgian politician and Flemish nationalist
Hendrik Fernandez (1932–2014), Indonesian Governor of West Timor
Hendrick Fisher (1697–1779), New Jersey colonial politician
Hendrick V. Fisher (1846-1909), American politician
Hendrik Goeman Borgesius (1847–1917), Dutch Minister of the Interior
Hendrik Johannes Grashoff (born 1961), Dutch politician and civil engineer
Hendrik of Guelders (1117–1182), Count of Guelders
Hendrik Antonie Lodewijk Hamelberg (1826–1896), Dutch lawyer and politician in South Africa
Hendrick Hansen (1665–1724), 5th Mayor of Albany, New York
Hendrik ten Hoeve (born 1946), Dutch Senate member
Hendrik Jan Hofstra (1904–1999), Dutch Labour Party politician
Hendrik Hoppenstedt (born 1972), German politician
Hendrick Hendricksen Kip (1600–1685), Dutch colonial magistrate in New Netherland
Toomas Hendrik Ilves (born 1953), Estonian politician, fourth President of Estonia
Hendrik Koekoek (1912–1987), Dutch farmer and politician
Hendrik Elle Koning (1933–2016), Dutch tax official and politician
Hendrik Menso (1791–1872), Dutch conservative politician
Hendrik Mentz (1877–1938), South African Minister of Defence
Hendrik Mulderije (1888–1970), Dutch Minister of Justice
Hendrik Pieter Nicolaas Muller (1859–1941), Dutch businessman, diplomat, explorer, publicist, and philanthropist
Hendrik of the Netherlands (1876–1934), Prince consort of the Netherlands, husband of Queen Wilhelmina
Hendrick Vaal Neto (born 1944), Angolan diplomat
Hendrik H.J. Ngantung (1921–1991), Indonesian painter and Governor of Jakarta
Hendrik van der Noot (1731–1827), Brabant jurist, lawyer, politician and revolutionary
Hendrik van Oranje-Nassau (1820–1879), Prince of the Netherlands, son of King William II
Hendrick Petrusma (born 1942), Dutch-born Australian politician
Hendrik Potgieter (1792–1852), South African Voortrekker leader
Hendrik van Rheede (1636–1691), Dutch colonial governor and botanist
Hendrik Jan Roethof (1921–1996), Dutch journalist and politician
Hendrik van Rossum (1919–2017), Dutch politician
Hendrick Schmidt (born 1963), South African politician
Hendrik Jan Smidt (1831–1917), Dutch Governor-General of Suriname
Hendrik Swellengrebel (1700–1760), Governor of the Dutch Cape Colony 
Hendrick Tejonihokarawa (c.1660–c.1735), Mohawk leader, one of the "Four Mohawk Kings"
Hendrick Theyanoguin (1692–1755), Mohawk leader associated with Sir William Johnson
Hendrik Tilanus (1884–1966), Dutch Christian politician
Hendrik Tonneboeijer (1814–1837), Dutch Commander of the Dutch Gold Coast 
Hendrik Verwoerd (1901–1966), Prime Minister of South Africa and designer of the apartheid policy, one of the principal commanders of Rhodesian Bush War
Hendrik J.H. Vonhoff (1931–2010), Dutch state secretary, mayor and Queens commissioner
Hendrik Vos (1903–1972), Dutch Labour Party politician
Hendrik Vroom (1850–1902), Gold Coast mulatto government official
Hendrik Samuel Witbooi (1906–1978), Namibian Orlam leader
Hendrik Witbooi (1934–2009), Namibian Khoikhoi leader and politician
Hendrik Witbooi (c.1830–1905), Namibian Khoikhoi leader
Hendrick Bradley Wright (1808–1881), U.S. House of Representatives member from Pennsylvania
Hendrik Jan Zeevalking (1922–2005), Dutch Minister of Transport and Water Management
Hendrick Zwaardecroon (1667–1728), Dutch Governor-General of the Dutch East Indies

Religion
Hendrik van Ahuis (1371–1439), Dutch founder of the Brethren of the Common Life in Germany
Hendrik Alting (1583–1644), Dutch-German theologian
Hendrik de Cock (1801–1842), Dutch Calvinist minister
Hendrick Joseph Cornelius Maria de Cocq (1906–1996), Dutch Catholic bishop in the South Pacific
Hendrik Jan Elhorst (1861–1924), Dutch Mennonite teacher and minister
Hendrik Arend van Gelder (1825–1899), Dutch Mennonite teacher and minister
Hendrik Hanegraaff (born 1950), Dutch-born American Christian author and talk-show host
Hendrik Herp (died 1477), Dutch or Flemish Franciscan mystic
Hendrik Kraemer (1888–1965), Dutch Protestant missionary
Hendrik Niclaes (1501–c.1580), German mystic
Hendrik Pierson (1834–1923), Dutch Lutheran minister and social activist
Hendrik Sumendap (born 1948), Indonesian Seventh-day Adventist leader
Hendrik Swalmius (1577–1649), Dutch theologian

Sports
Hendrick Bertz (born 1988), German canoer
Hendrik de Best (1905–1978), Dutch boxer
Hendrik Bonmann (born 1994), German footballer
Hendrik Egnatius Botha (born 1958), South African rugby player
Hendrik Brocks (born 1942), Indonesian cyclist
Hendrik Buhrmann (born 1963), South African golfer
Hendrik Cornelisse (born 1940), Dutch cyclist
Hendrik Johannes Cruijff (1947–2016), Dutch footballer
Hendrik Joseph Daniller (born 1984), South African rugby player
Hendrik Jan Davids (born 1969), Dutch tennis player
Hendrik Johannes Nicasius de Vries (born 1995), Dutch racing driver
Hendrik Devos (born 1955), Belgian cyclist
Hendrik Dippenaar (born 1977), South African cricketer
Hendrik Dreekmann (born 1975), German tennis player
Hendrik Elzerman (born 1958), Dutch swimmer
Hendrik Feldwehr (born 1986), German swimmer
Hendrik Geldenhuys (born 1983), Namibian cricketer
Hendrik Maarten van Gent (born 1951), Dutch competitive sailor
Hendrik van der Grift (born 1935), Dutch speed skater
Hendrik de Grijff (1892–1976), Dutch sports shooter
Hendrik Groot (born 1938), Dutch footballer
Hendrik Großöhmichen (born 1985), German footballer
Hendrik Hagens (1900–1981), Dutch fencer
Hendrik Hahne (born 1986), German footballer
Hendrik Hansen (born 1994), German footballer
Hendrik Jan Held (born 1967), Dutch volleyball player
Hendrik Helmke (born 1987), German footballer
Hendrik Herzog (born 1969), German football player and coach
Hendrik van Heuckelum (1879–1929), Dutch footballer
Hendrik Hordijk (1893–1975), Dutch footballer
Hendrik de Iongh (1877–1962), Dutch fencer
Hendrik Isemborghs (1914–1973), Belgian footballer
Hendrik Pieter de Jongh (born 1970), Dutch football player and manager
Hendrik Jung (born 1956), German fencer
Hendrik Kersken (1880–1967), Dutch competitive sailor
Hendrik Jan Kooijman (born 1960), Dutch field hockey player
Hendrik Krediet (born 1942), Dutch modern pentathlete
Hendrik Krüzen (born 1964), Dutch footballer
Hendrik Pieter Le Roux (born 1967), South African rugby player
Hendrik Christiaan de Looper (1912–2006), Dutch field hockey player
Hendrik Marx (1989–2010), Namibian cricketer
Hendrik Meijer (born 1959), Dutch taekwondo competitor and coach
Hendrick Mokganyetsi (born 1975), South African sprinter
Hendrik-Jan Mol (born 1977), Dutch cricketer
Hendrik Mulder (born c.1975), South African rugby player
Hendrik A.J. Muller (1887–1940), Dutch footballer
Hendrik S.V. Muller (1922–1977), South African rugby player
Hendrik Numan (born 1955), Dutch judoka
Hendrik Odendaal (born 1979), South African swimmer
Hendrik Offerhaus (1875–1953), Dutch rower
Hendrik Ooms (1916–1993), Dutch cyclist
Hendrik J. Otto (born 1976), South African golfer
Hendrik Pekeler (born 1991), German handball player
Han Hendrik Piho (born 1993), Estonian Nordic combined skier
Hendrick Ramaala (born 1972), South African long-distance runner
Hendrik Redant (born 1962), Belgian cyclist and directeur sportif
Hendrik Reiher (born 1962), East German rowing cox
Hendrik Roodt (born 1987), South African rugby player
Hendrik Wopke Rouwé (born 1946), Dutch rower
Hendrik Rubeksen (born 1983), Faroese footballer
Hendrik Schenk (born 1945), Dutch-born American Olympic wrestler
Hendrik Scherpenhuijzen (1882–1971), Dutch fencer
Hendrik Schoofs (born 1950), Belgian long-distance runner
Hendrik Sirringhaus (born 1985), German ice hockey goaltender
Hendrik Snoek (born 1948), German show jumper
Hendrik Somaeb (born 1992), Namibian footballer
Hendrik Starostzik (born 1991), German footballer
Hendrik Starreveld (1914–2008), Dutch sprint canoer
Hendrik Stroo (1927–1991), Dutch sprint canoer
Hendrik C. van Suylekom (1904–1982), Dutch rower
Hendrik Timmer (1904–1998), Dutch tennis and squash player
Hendrik Timmer (born 1971), Dutch football goalkeeper
Hendrik Tommelein (born 1962), Belgian hurdler
Hendrik Adriaan Toonen (born 1954), Dutch water polo player
Hendrik Tui (born 1987), New Zealand-born Japanese rugby player
Hendrik Van Crombrugge (born 1993), Belgian footballer
Hendrik Erasmus van der Dussen (born 1989), South African cricketer
Hendrik Van Dijck (born 1974), Belgian road cyclist
Hendrik Verbrugghe (1929–2009), Belgian sprint canoeist
Hendrik van der Wal (1886–1982), Dutch running athlete
Hendrick Waye (1877–1961), Australian rules footballer
Hendrik Weerink (1936–2014), Dutch football referee
Hendrik van der Zee (1929–1991), Dutch boxer 
Hendrick Zuck (born 1990), German footballer

Writing
Hendrik Adamson (1891–1946), Estonian poet and teacher
Hendrik van Aken (1250s – 1320s), Brabantian Middle Dutch poet and writer
Hendrik van Alkmaar (fl.1475–1487), Middle Dutch author of Reynard the Fox
Hendrik Bulthuis (1865–1945), Dutch Esperanto author and translator 
Hendrik Conscience (1812–1883), Belgian author
Hendrik Hertzberg (born 1943), American journalist and liberal political commentator
Hendrik J.A. Hofland (1927–2016), Dutch journalist, commentator, essayist, and columnist
Hendrik Lindepuu (born 1958), Estonian translator and playwright
Hendrik Willem van Loon (1882–1944), Dutch-American historian, journalist, and children's book author
Hendrik Mande (1350s–1431), Dutch mystical writer
Hendrik Marsman (1899–1940), Dutch poet and writer
Hendrik Jan Schimmel (1823–1906), Dutch poet and novelist
Hendrik Laurenszoon Spiegel (1549–1612), Dutch writer and linguist
Hendrik L.E.M. Terlingen (1941–1994), Dutch radio and television presenter
Hendrik Tollens (1780–1856), Dutch poet
Hendrik van Veldeke (c.1145–1184), Limburgish writer, first to write in (Limburgish) Dutch
Hendrik de Vries (1896–1989), Dutch poet and painter

Other
Hendrik Geeraert (1863–1925), Belgian skipper and World War I folk hero
Hendrik Goosen (1904–1990), South African fishing captain, discoverer of the coelacanth
Hendrick van Hoven (died 1699), Dutch pirate
Hendrik Hubertsen (1560s – 1627), Dutch shipbuilder working in Sweden
Hendrik Jut (1851–1878), Dutch murderer
Hendrik Koot (1898–1941), Dutch collaborator during World War II
Hendrick Lucifer (1583–1627), Dutch pirate
Hendrik van Nassau d'Averquerque (1673–1754), Dutch-born British peer and courtier
Hendrik Spoorbek (?–1845), German-born South African seer, healer and magician
Hendrik van den Bergh (1914–1997), South African founder of the Bureau of State Security 
Hendrik Verhoeff (c.1645–1710), Dutch silversmith and assassin
Hendrik Otto Westbroek (born 1952), Dutch radiohost, singer-songwriter, and political activist

Fiction
Hendrik van der Decken, Mythical Captain of the Flying Dutchman

See also 
Toomas Hendrik Ilves, Former President of Estonia

 Hendric
 Hendrick (disambiguation)
 Hendricks (disambiguation)

 Hendrickx
 Hendriks
 Hendrikx

 Hendrix (disambiguation)
 Hendryx

 Henrik
 Henry (disambiguation)
 Henryk (given name)

 Articles that start with Hendrik

Dutch masculine given names
Estonian masculine given names